Horst Naumann (born 17 November 1925 in Dresden, Germany) is a German actor.

Selected filmography
 Das geheimnisvolle Wrack (1954)
 Carola Lamberti - Eine vom Zirkus (1954)
 Just Once a Great Lady (1957)
 Alter Kahn und junge Liebe (1957)
 U 47 – Kapitänleutnant Prien (1958)
 Court Martial (1959)
 Do Not Send Your Wife to Italy (1960)
 The Last of Mrs. Cheyney (1961)
 The Forester's Daughter (1962)
 The Doctor of St. Pauli (1968)
 On the Reeperbahn at Half Past Midnight (1969)
 The Priest of St. Pauli (1970)
 Bloody Friday (1972)
 Old Barge, Young Love (1973)
 Das Traumschiff (1983-2010, TV series)

External links

Short Biography 
Profile 

1925 births
Living people
German male film actors
German male television actors
20th-century German male actors
21st-century German male actors
Actors from Dresden